Bodø is a town in Bodø Municipality in Nordland county, Norway.  The town is the administrative centre of Bodø Municipality and of Nordland county.  It is located on the Bodø peninsula between the Vestfjorden and the Saltfjorden.  Bodø is located just north of the Arctic Circle. It is the largest urban area and town in Nordland county and it is the second-largest town in Northern Norway.

History

The village of Bodø was granted town status in 1816 and soon after, in 1818, it was known for the Bodø affair, smuggling by British merchants that later were compensated by Norway.  The town of Bodø was established as a municipality on 1 January 1838 (see formannskapsdistrikt law).  On 1 January 1938, a part of the neighboring municipality of Bodin (population: 559) was transferred into the town of Bodø.  On 1 January 1959, another part of Bodin (population: 1,303) was transferred into the town Bodø, expanding its size considerably.  During the 1960s, there were many municipal mergers across Norway due to the work of the Schei Committee. On 1 January 1968, the town of Bodø (population: 14,252) was merged with the municipality of Bodin (population: 13,323) and this created the much larger Bodø Municipality.

Toponymy
The town is named after the old Bodøgård farm, since the town was built on its ground.

Institutions 

The main campus of Nord University is located  outside the city centre. Twelve thousand undergraduate and graduate students study at the university.

Bodø is the location of the only police academy in Norway outside Oslo. The Norwegian Civil Aviation Authority is situated in Bodø, as is the Joint Rescue Coordination Centre of Northern Norway. The Norwegian Armed Forces headquarters for North Norway is located at Reitan, east of the city. SB Nordlandsbuss has its headquarters in Bodø, as does Bodø Energi and Nordlandsbanken.

The largest shopping centre in Nordland, City Nord, is located in Bodø.

Climate
Bodø features a humid continental climate (Dfb) or, if the original Köppen winter threshold  is used, an oceanic climate (Cfb) in the 1991-2020 base period. Bodø is one of the northernmost cities in the world and the only inside the Arctic Circle with a temperate four-season climate. The weather in Bodø depends on weather pattern; long lasting weather patterns with Atlantic lows bringing rain and overcast can occur in all seasons, but so can sunny weather with Highs over Northern Scandiniava/Western Russia.
Located on a peninsula in the Norwegian Sea, Bodø has potential for strong winds both from the west and east. The "midnight sun" is above the horizon from 1 June to 14 July (44 days), and the period with continuous daylight lasts a bit longer.
The all-time high  was set in July 2019, while July 2014 was the warmest month with a 24-hr mean  and average daily high . The warmest night recorded was June 29, 1972 with overnight low . The average date for the first overnight freeze (below ) in autumn is October 12 (1981-2010 average). The driest month on record was January 2014 with no precipitation at all, while the wettest was September 2009 with 293 mm.

Recent decades have seen warming, and there has been no overnight air frost in June since 1981. ; with its location on the Arctic Circle the city features one of the largest latitudinal temperature anomalies on Earth. Data in table below is from Bodø Airport, summer daily highs are often warmer in the city center.

Earlier weather data for Bodø, which then had a subpolar Oceanic Climate (Cfc).

Military

Bodø has a long history with the Norwegian Armed Forces, and especially the Royal Norwegian Air Force (RNoAF). The Norwegian Armed Forces Joint Operational Headquarters are located at Reitan, east of Bodø. Parts of NATO air forces attending the annual Cold Response are stationed at Bodø Main Air Station. Bodø MAS is a major Norwegian military air base, housing two-thirds of Norway's F-16 fighter force and two of RNoAFs SAR Sea Kings. Bodø, competing with Ørland and Evenes, is a candidate for the Northern Air Base in the new RNoAF system.

Bodin Leir located near the air station was an RNoAF recruit school including Norwegian Advanced Surface to Air Missile System personnel and a national response unit. The base was central during the Cold War due to its strategic location and proximity to the Soviet Union. It would have been vital in the build-up of NATO air and land forces to defend Norway, and thus the entire northern flank of NATO, in a war with the Warsaw Pact. It could also have been used as a forward base for American bombers to strike targets in the Soviet Union. Now Bodin Leir is an camp to house military personnel for the Norwegian Joint Headquarters and Bodø Main Air Station.

Bodø has a street named General Fleischer's Gate in honour of Carl Gustav Fleischer.

Bodø received international attention during the U-2 Crisis in May 1960, when it became known that the American U-2 pilot Gary Powers had been shot down over the Soviet Union on his way from Pakistan to Bodø.

Culture

Bodø's local newspaper is the Avisa Nordland.

The Norwegian Aviation Museum and Salten Museum are located in Bodø. Salten Museum has four exhibitions: The Lofoten Fisheries, a Sami exhibit, a Viking treasure, and an exhibition about Bodø's history from 1816 to 2000.

The Bodø Cathedral was built in 1956, representing post-war architecture, whereas the Bodin Church just outside the city centre dates from the 13th century, representing a typical medieval stone church.  Other churches in the town include Hunstad Church and Rønvik Church.

The new cultural centre "Stormen" (the storm) was opened in 2014. It contains a library, a concert hall and theater. The building is designed by Daniel Rosbottom and David Howarth.  Bodø is host to the cultural festivals Nordland Musikkfestuke and Parkenfestivalen every summer, as well as the free and volunteer based Bodø Hardcore Festival in early winter.

Fram Kino was the first cinema in Norway. It was started in the year 1908.

Sports
Bodø's main professional team is the football club Bodø/Glimt, playing in Eliteserien, the top division of football in Norway.

In addition to Bodø/Glimt, Bodø has had several teams at national top level, including Grand Bodø (women's football), Junkeren (women's handball) and Bodø HK (men's handball).

The most well-known sporting arena in Bodø is Aspmyra Stadion, which in addition to being the home of Bodø/Glimt has hosted one international match.
Also, the multi-purpose indoor Bodø Spektrum, contains full-size football and handball courts, as well as several swimming and bathing facilities.

The town is also home of Bodø Barbarians, a leading rugby league team.

See also
List of towns and cities in Norway

References

Bodø
Cities and towns in Norway
Populated places in Nordland
Port cities and towns in Norway
Populated places of Arctic Norway
1816 establishments in Norway
Populated places established in 1816